The Nigerian National Assembly delegation from Imo comprises three Senators representing Imo North, Imo East, and Imo West, and ten Representatives representing  Ahiazu Mbaise/Ezinihitte, Orlu/Oru East, Aboh Mbaise/Ngor Okpala, Ohaji/Egbema/Oguta, Ideato North/Ideato South, Okigwe North, Ehime Mbano/Ihitte Uboma/Obowo, Mbaitolu/Ikeduru, Owerri Municipal/Owerri North/Owerri West, and Nkwerre/Nwangele/Isu/Njaba.

Fourth Republic

The 9th Parliament (2019 - 2023)

The 8th Parliament (2015 - 2019)

The 7th Parliament (2011 - 2015)

The 6th Assembly (2007 - 2011)

The 5th Assembly (2003 - 2007)

The 4th Parliament (1999 - 2003)

References
Official Website - National Assembly House of Representatives (Imo State)
 Senator List

Imo State
National Assembly (Nigeria) delegations by state